Mosammat Ritu Moni (born 5 February 1993) is a Bangladeshi cricketer who plays for the Bangladesh women's national cricket team. She plays as a right-handed batter and a right-arm medium bowler.

Career
Moni made her ODI debut against Pakistan on 20 August 2012. Moni made her T20I debut against Ireland on 28 August 2012. In October 2018, she was named in Bangladesh's squad for the 2018 ICC Women's World Twenty20 tournament in the West Indies.

In August 2019, she was named in Bangladesh's squad for the 2019 ICC Women's World Twenty20 Qualifier tournament in Scotland. In November 2019, she was named in Bangladesh's squad for the cricket tournament at the 2019 South Asian Games. The Bangladesh team beat Sri Lanka by two runs in the final to win the gold medal.

In January 2020, she was named in Bangladesh's squad for the 2020 ICC Women's T20 World Cup in Australia. In November 2021, she was named in Bangladesh's team for the 2021 Women's Cricket World Cup Qualifier tournament in Zimbabwe. In January 2022, she was named in Bangladesh's team for the 2022 Commonwealth Games Cricket Qualifier tournament in Malaysia. Later the same month, she was named in Bangladesh's team for the 2022 Women's Cricket World Cup in New Zealand.

References

External links
 
 

1993 births
Living people
People from Bogra District
Bangladeshi women cricketers
Bangladesh women Twenty20 International cricketers
Bangladesh women One Day International cricketers
Rajshahi Division women cricketers
Sylhet Division women cricketers
Mymensingh Division women cricketers
Northern Zone women cricketers
South Asian Games gold medalists for Bangladesh
South Asian Games medalists in cricket